The Marine is a 2006 American action film directed by John Bonito, and starring professional wrestler John Cena in his acting debut. It was executive produced by Vince McMahon through the film production division of WWE, called WWE Studios, and distributed in the United States by 20th Century Fox. The screenplay was written by Alan B. McElroy and Michelle Gallagher.

The Marine was released theatrically on October 13, 2006 to negative reviews and grossed $22 million against a production budget of $15 million. It is the first entry in The Marine film series, spawning five direct-to-video sequels.

Plot
In Iraq, John Triton, a U.S. Marine arrives at an al-Qaeda hideout, where a group of terrorists are preparing to behead several hostages. Disregarding direct orders to wait for reinforcements, Triton attacks the extremists and rescues the hostages.  The next morning, his colonel informs Triton that he is being honorably discharged for disobeying direct orders.

Now retired, Triton finds it hard to settle back into normal life. He is fired from his job as a security guard for using excessive force on an employee's ex-boyfriend and his bodyguards. Triton's wife Kate decides the two need a vacation to help Triton adjust to his new life. Meanwhile, criminal Rome robs a jewelry store with his gang: girlfriend Angela, Morgan, Vescera, and Bennett. Rome is in collusion with an anonymous partner, with whom he is planning on sharing the profits from the diamonds. On the run, the gang stops at a gas station where Triton and Kate have stopped. When two policemen arrive to buy gas, Morgan shoots and kills one of the officers, causing Rome to shoot  the other officer while Angela kills the gas station attendant. When Triton reacts to Kate being kidnapped, Bennett knocks him out. Triton regains consciousness and gives chase in the policemen's car. The chase leads to a lake, where Triton falls out of the patrol car and into the lake, seemingly to his death.

Rome and his gang walk through a swamp to avoid the police. Kate tries to escape several times. Triton emerges from the lake to find Detective Van Buren, who is pursuing the gang.  Van Buren denies Triton permission to pursue the gang, but Triton heads into the swamp anyway. After an altercation between Morgan and Vescera, Rome decides to kill Vescera. Rome gets a call from his anonymous partner, and Rome tells him that he intends to cut the partner out of the deal.

The gang arrives at a lodge and decide to rest there for the time being. Meanwhile, Triton is kidnapped by two fugitives who believe he is a police officer looking for them. He subdues them and tracks the gang to the lodge. He kills Morgan and Bennett then drags the bodies under the lodge, where he again meets Detective Van Buren.

Kate rushes out of the lodge, but Angela attacks and recaptures her. Meanwhile, Triton enters the lodge and finds himself face-to-face with Rome and his gun. Van Buren enters the room but points his gun at Triton, revealing himself to be the anonymous partner. Rome opens fire on Triton, who uses Van Buren as a human shield, killing him. Rome makes his escape and joins up with Angela and Kate before firing at a gasoline tank and blowing up the lodge. Triton makes a narrow escape, having been blown into the swamp.

Rome escapes in Van Buren's car, but abandons it due to a police tracking device. Angela seduces then kills a truck driver for his truck. Triton is arrested by a marine patrol officer, but steals the officer's vessel after handcuffing him. He races to the marina that is Rome's destination, jumping on Rome's truck, throwing Angela into the windshield of an oncoming bus, killing her and spilling the diamonds. Rome scrapes Triton off the truck by driving into the side of a building, careening through a warehouse, then leaps out just before the truck crashes into a lake. Triton then engages Rome in fight in hand-to-hand combat and manages to gain the upper hand by punching several times overwhelmingly and knocks him out before he stumbles out, leaving Rome in the fiery warehouse, then rescues Kate, who is drowning in the truck. A badly-burned Rome returns and tries to choke Triton with a chain. Triton kills Rome by breaking his neck with the chain. The final scene depicts Triton and Kate kissing as the police arrive.

Cast

 John Cena as Sergeant John Triton
 Robert Patrick as Rome, Gang Leader
 Kelly Carlson as Kate Triton, John's Wife
 Anthony Ray Parker as Morgan, Rome's Crew
 Abigail Bianca as Angela, Rome's Lover & Crew
 Damon Gibson as Vescera, Rome's Crew
 Manu Bennett as Bennett, Rome's Crew
 Jerome Ehlers as Detective Van Buren, Rome's Accomplice
 Drew Powell as Joe Linwood
 Firass Dirani as Rebel Leader 
 Frank Carlopio as Frank
 Jeff Chase as Billy
 Jamal Duff as Paul

Production

The Marine was originally written with Al Pacino in mind for the part of criminal Rome, with Stone Cold Steve Austin as hero Triton. After Austin and WWE parted ways in 2004, Randy Orton was set to be the main character. Orton turned down the role because of his bad conduct discharge from the Marines in the late 1990s, and was replaced by John Cena. Pacino turned down the role of Rome due to the low salary offered. After Pacino turned it down, Ray Liotta was considered for the role of Rome, but Robert Patrick got the part instead.

Principal photography for the film was actually shot and completed in 2004. In order to cover for John Cena's absence from WWE events, a storyline was written after Carlito beat Cena for the WWE United States Championship, saying that he was stabbed by Carlito's bodyguard Jesús and was taking time off to recover.

Filming was done at Movie World Studios in Gold Coast, Queensland, Australia. The Marine Base was filmed at Bond University. The part in which skyscrapers are shown is the downtown area of Brisbane, Australia.  Other footage was shot in bush land surrounding Brisbane.  The opening segment of the downtown scenes was filmed in Calgary, Alberta, Canada. Cena was approached by Vince McMahon to do the movie which he accepted for outside fame. On making the movie he said "I enjoyed the business plan, I didn't enjoy the experience".

Release

Box office
In its first weekend, the film made approximately $7.1 million at the United States box office. In its first weekend, it placed #6 domestically. 
After a total of ten weeks in theaters, the film grossed $18.8 million domestically.

Critical response
The film received mostly negative reviews, holding a 17% rating on Rotten Tomatoes based on 46 reviews (with an average rating of 4 out of 10), with the site's general consensus stating "Overblown in every possible way, The Marine is either so bad it's good or just really, really bad." Eric the Actor was a fan of the film and wanted to promote the film due his fondness for Cena on the Howard Stern Show; however, his promotion and rally for people to go and see this film failed.

Home media
The film was released on DVD on January 30, 2007, which featured the "rated" version and the "unrated" version. The Blu-ray version was released on February 13, 2007, with a DTS-HD Lossless Master Audio 5.1 track and a 1080p HD transfer. The DVD grossed $27.3 million in domestic video sales.

Sequels
The film has spawned five direct-to-video sequels:
 The Marine 2, featuring Ted DiBiase, Jr. in the main role, released on December 29, 2009
 The Marine 3: Homefront, released on March 5, 2013
 The Marine 4: Moving Target, released on April 21, 2015
 The Marine 5: Battleground, released on April 25, 2017
 The Marine 6: Close Quarters, released on November 13, 2018

The last four sequels have starred professional wrestler Mike "The Miz" Mizanin in the role of Jake Carter.

References

External links
 
 
 
 

2006 films
2006 action films
20th Century Fox films
American action films
American action comedy films
2000s English-language films
Films scored by Don Davis (composer)
Films set in South Carolina
Films shot in Calgary
Iraq War films
Films about the United States Marine Corps
WWE Studios films
2006 directorial debut films
Films shot at Village Roadshow Studios
2000s American films